Berghofer is a surname. Notable people with the surname include:

 Chuck Berghofer (born 1937), American jazz double bassist and electric bassist
 Clive Berghofer (born 1935), Australian property developer, politician and philanthropist
 Gabriele Berghofer (born 1963), Austrian Paralympic skier and athlete
 Mark Berghofer (born 1985), Australian international lawn bowler

See also
 Clive Berghofer Stadium, Toowoomba
 QIMR Berghofer Medical Research Institute, Brisbane

German-language surnames